Carwinley is a hamlet in Cumbria, England, located on the border with Scotland. It was first mentioned in 1202 as Karwindelhov.

The ancient monument of Liddel Strength is about 1 km north of the settlement.

References

Hamlets in Cumbria
City of Carlisle